Samuel Andrejčík (born 10 September 1996) is a Slovak Paralympic boccia player who competes in the BC4 category. In the 2016 Summer Paralympics he won the gold medal in pairs with Róbert Ďurkovič and Michaela Balcová and silver medal in individual BC4.

References

1996 births
Living people
Boccia players at the 2016 Summer Paralympics
Paralympic gold medalists for Slovakia
Paralympic boccia players of Slovakia
Medalists at the 2016 Summer Paralympics
Paralympic medalists in boccia
Sportspeople from Prešov